Warrior woman or Woman Warrior may refer to:

Literature and comics
Women warriors in literature and culture, an archetype in legend and literature
The Woman Warrior (1975), a memoir by Maxine Hong Kingston
Warrior Woman (Marvel Comics), a Marvel Comics supervillain character
Hippolyta (Marvel Comics), a Marvel Comics supervillain turned superhero, who also uses the alias "Warrior Woman"

Other uses
"Warrior Woman", a single by Carol Kenyon
War Goddess, a 1973 Italian adventure fantasy drama, directed by Terence Young

See also
Women in ancient warfare
List of women warriors in folklore

Women warriors